The red-browed pardalote (Pardalotus rubricatus) is a small brightly coloured insectivorous passerine, endemic to Australia . A gleaning specialist, they forage primarily in eucalypt trees .
The Latin word rubricatus means 'red-ochred' which is descriptive of their orange-red eyebrow . Other common names include red-browed diamondbird, bellbird, cape red-browed, pale red-browed, fawn-eyed, fawn-eyebrowed and pallid or red-lored pardalote .

Taxonomy

Red-browed pardalotes belong to the order Passeriformes and family Pardalotidae of which four species are recognised: red-browed pardalote Pardalotus rubricatus, spotted pardalote Pardalotus punctatus, forty-spotted pardalote Pardalotus quadragintus and striated pardalote Pardalotus striatus. 
Historically, the family Pardalotidae included pardalotes and acanthizid warblers; gerygones, scrubwrens and thornbills .  
However, recent phylogenetic and morphological studies ,  indicate that pardalotes are more closely related to honeyeaters than acanthizid warblers, which resulted in the separation of this group into two families, Pardalotidae and Acanthizidae .   The pardalote, acanthizid warbler, honeyeater and bristlebird family, form a monophyletic group .

Subspecies
Matthews described the subspecies Pardalotus yorki in 1913 . Their range begins at the base of the Gulf of Carpentaria and extends north along the Cape York Peninsula in Far North Queensland . Difference in morphology and plumage distinguish this subspecies from the nominate race .

Description

Adult red–browed pardalotes are a large pardalote with an average length of 105 mm and wingspan of 60–66 mm. Males weigh approximately 10.9g and females weigh 10.8 g. The average length of the male tarsus is 18.3 mm and female tarsus is 18.5 mm .   
The subspecies yorki are smaller in size, 100–120 mm long and weigh less at 9.3 g.  The average length of the male tarsus is 17.4 mm and female tarsus is 17.3 mm  , . Their wingspan is 58–62 mm in length .

The red–browed pardalote does not exhibit plumage that changes seasonally and is not sexually dichromatic . The nominate race rubricatus have a pale iris, a black crown with distinctive white spots and a yellow to buff supercilium. They have a red to orange-red brow and a yellow breast patch with yellow wing panels , . Juvenile birds are generally paler in comparison to adults . They have a darker iris that is olive to pale olive, a duller crown with less obvious patterning and a dull orange-yellow brow .

The sub-species yorki are generally more brightly coloured than the nominate race .  They have an iris that is straw-brown or yellow, a black crown with fine spots; fine dark scalloping across their mantel and hind neck.  They have a bright yellow breast patch, yellow rump and an orange wing panel , . Plumage of the juvenile  yorki subspecies has not been described .

The call of the red-browed pardalote is a distinctive five or six note song, with the first note longer and lower pitched than the remaining notes which increase in pitch and speed , .  Males call periodically between feeding to announce their territory from a sheltered perch within the trees canopy . It has been described as sounding similar to the call of a rosella species .

Distribution and habitat

The red-browed pardalote is a widely distributed species ranging from north and central Australia, south and south central Western Australia, northeast South Australia ( Lake Eyre Basin) to south west New South Wales. They may also be found throughout the Great Sandy, Gibson and Great Victoria Desert .   
They live in a wide range of habitats including woodlands, shrublands, tropical, arid and semi-arid regions of Australia .

In the desert sand-ridge country of Western Australia, red-browed pardalotes forage in the upper story of bloodwoods and marble gums dispersed amongst sand dunes . Red-browed pardalotes may also inhabit sand dunes, rocky outcrops, valleys and floodplains .

Behaviour

Foraging and diet 

Red-browed pardalotes are sedentary  and hold foraging territories throughout the year . They are usually seen singly, in pairs or small groups of up to five or six birds . They are arboreal and spend most of their time foraging in the foliage of eucalypt trees . Their 'scoop-shaped' bill is used to glean insects and lerps (exudates of psyllids) from the leaf surface , .  Lerps are a major food source for pardalotes providing sugar and carbohydrates . They also consume arthropods, beetles (Coleoptera species), gum leaf beetle (Paropsis species), flies, mosquitoes, flowerflies, leafhoppers, shield bugs, psyllids, bees, ants, wasps and vegetable matter 
.

Breeding 
The red-browed pardalote breeds between July and December and after rainfall in arid zones . Pairs are monogamous and maintain breeding territories ,  .  Both the male and female excavate a tunnel 6–122 cm long and a nesting chamber 10–12.7 cm deep, 6.3–10 cm wide and 14.0 cm high.  This can be found in a range of locations, including sandy banks, gullies, cuttings, sand dunes, sand cliffs or piles of sand and soil .

Red-browed pardalotes may also excavate the burrows of kangaroo rats (Potoroidae), hopping mice (Notomys) and bilbies (Macrotis lagotis) .  They occasionally nest in tree hollows, spouts or hollow branches , . A bird was once recorded nesting halfway down an iron pipe that was set upright in the ground .

Nests may be constructed of strips of bark, horsehair and are lined with fine grass or bark and shaped into a rounded cup within the excavated chamber 
, . A clutch of up to four white, oval, semi-glossy eggs measuring 19mm x 15 mm are laid . The incubation period is unknown, however both sexes incubate the eggs. Chicks are altricial and are fed by both adults .

Conservation status
The International Union for Conservation of Nature (IUCN) has categorised the red-browed pardalote as a species of least concern. Although its population size has not been quantified, the species is common throughout its range, and its population is considered to be stable.

References

External links
 Red-browed pardalote species fact sheet from BirdLife International
 Red-browed pardalote distribution map, song recording and egg pictures from the Atlas of Living Australia

red-browed pardalote
Endemic birds of Australia
red-browed pardalote